Trou Caïman (literally "Caiman's Hole" in French), sometimes called Eau Gallée by locals, is a saltwater lake in Haiti known for its excellent birdwatching opportunities.

Description
The lake is 9 km (5.6 mi) long, 3 km (1.9 mi) wide, and approximately 16 km² (6.2 mi²) in area. It is located northeast of Croix-des-Bouquets in the Ouest department in the Plaine du Cul-de-Sac rift valley nearby much larger saline lakes, chiefly Lake Azuéi in Haiti east of which is Lake Enriquillo in the Dominican Republic.

The lake is semi-endorheic as seasonally it overflows into a straightened channel which is shallow to the east into endorheic (with no outflow to the sea) Lake Azuéi.

References

Lakes of Haiti